The Sri Lankan national basketball team represents Sri Lanka in international competitions. It is administrated by the Sri Lanka Basketball Federation (SLBF). Until 1972 it was known as Ceylon national basketball team.

The team qualified for the Asian Basketball Championship 7 times and was among Asia's 12 top basketball teams in 1981.

History
Basketball was first introduced to Sri Lanka in 1917 by an American, Walter Cammak. Ten years later in 1927, Ananda College was the first school to introduce basketball in Sri Lanka, causing other schools to follow. In 1958, the Ceylon Basketball Federation (CBF) was established and was consequently admitted into FIBA in 1959. Sri Lanka joined the Asian Basketball Confederation (ABC) in 1962, and has participated in most ABC competitions since.

Team

Current roster

2021 FIBA Asia Cup qualification
Opposition: Jordan (21 February)
Venue: Prince Hamza, Amman
Opposition: Palestine (24 February)
Venue: Arab American University, Jenin

Past roster
At the 2017 SABA Championship:  (Bronze medal squad)

Competitions

Summer Olympics
Yet to Qualify

World championships

FIBA Asia Cup

Asian Games

1966 : 10th
2018 : Did not Participate

South Asian Games

1995-2010 : ?
2019 :

FIBA South Asia Championship

2014 : 
2015 : 
2017 : 
2018 : 
2021 :

Lusophony Games

Never Participated

Commonwealth Games

Never Participated

Head coach position
Ajit Kuruppu - 2013
 Prasanna Jaysinghe - 2017

Past Rosters 
Scroll down to see more.
At 2009 FIBA Asia Championship:

Head coach: Ajit Kuruppu

See also
 Sri Lanka national under-19 basketball team
 Sri Lanka national under-17 basketball team
 Sri Lanka national 3x3 team
 Sri Lanka women's national basketball team

References

External links
Sri Lanka Basketball Federation
Sri Lanka Basketball Records at FIBA Archive
History of Basketball in Sri Lanka - asia-basket.com
Presentation on Facebook
Sri Lanka Basketball - on ThePapare.com
Presentation on Twitter

 
Men's national basketball teams
1959 establishments in Ceylon
Basketball teams established in 1959